Forest Hills is an unincorporated community in Page County, in the U.S. state of Virginia.  The neighborhood is located in the southwest portion of the Luray town limit.

References

Unincorporated communities in Virginia
Unincorporated communities in Page County, Virginia